Patrick Burke (born November 6, 1968 in Jamaica) is a retired professional Canadian football defensive back who played for five seasons for the Ottawa Rough Riders, Toronto Argonauts, Saskatchewan Roughriders, and Winnipeg Blue Bombers. He was drafted first overall in the 1993 CFL Draft by the BC Lions. He played college football for Butler Community College and Fresno City College.

References

1968 births
Living people
Canadian football people from Toronto
Canadian football defensive backs
Butler Grizzlies football players
Fresno City Rams football players
Toronto Argonauts players